Deinotrichia is a monotypic moth genus in the family Geometridae described by Warren in 1893. Its only species, Deinotrichia scotosiaria, was described by the same author in the same year. The species was described from Sikkim, India.

References

Ennominae